Night Hunter is a novel series by Robert P Faulcon published beginning in 1983.

Plot summary
Night Hunter is a novel series in which the main character seeks to free his abducted family from evil cultists.

Series
The series consists of the following novels:

 The Stalking, 1983 
 The Talisman, 1983
 The Ghost Dance, 1984 
 The Shrine, 1984 
 The Hexing, 1984
 The Labyrinth, 1988

Reception
Dave Pringle reviewed The Stalking and The Talisman for Imagine magazine, and stated that "The author is a known British SF writer, here lurking under his umpteenth pseudonym. Updated Dennis Wheatley, they move along quite adequately, with dollops of gore and sex to keep you in a fun frame of mind."

Dave Langford reviewed Night Hunter for White Dwarf #46, and stated that "Horror fans could do worse than these books."

References

1983 novels